Chanaka Ruwansiri (born 14 October 1989) is a Sri Lankan cricketer. He made his first-class debut on 18 February 2011, for Sri Lanka Navy Sports Club in the 2010–11 Premier Trophy. In October 2020, he was drafted by the Galle Gladiators for the inaugural edition of the Lanka Premier League.

References

External links
 

1989 births
Living people
Sri Lankan cricketers
Lankan Cricket Club cricketers
Saracens Sports Club cricketers
Seeduwa Raddoluwa Cricket Club cricketers
Sri Lanka Navy Sports Club cricketers
Place of birth missing (living people)
Galle Gladiators cricketers